Portimão station is the main railway station in the city of Portimão, Portugal, operated by . It opened on 30 July 1922.

References 

Railway stations in Portugal
Railway stations opened in 1889